Forsyth County (  or  ) is a county in the northeast portion of the U.S. state of Georgia. Suburban and exurban in character, Forsyth County lies within the Atlanta Metropolitan Area. The county's only incorporated city and county seat is Cumming.
At the 2020 census, the population was 251,283. Forsyth was the fastest-growing county in Georgia and the 15th fastest-growing county in the United States between 2010 and 2019.

Forsyth County's rapid population growth can be attributed to its proximity to high-income employment opportunities in nearby Alpharetta and northern Fulton County, its equidistant location between the big-city amenities of bustling Atlanta and the recreation offerings of the scenic Blue Ridge Mountains, its plentiful supply of large, relatively affordable new-construction homes, and its highly ranked public school system. The influx of high-income professionals and their families has increased the county's median annual household income dramatically in recent years; at $104,687, Forsyth County was the wealthiest in Georgia and the 19th-wealthiest in the United States as of 2018 estimates.

In the 1980s, the county attracted national media attention as the site of large civil rights demonstrations and counter-demonstrations. Organizers hoped to dispel the county's image as a conservative and hate-filled sundown county; African Americans were unjustly forced out in 1912, and the county had a reputation of being hostile to people of color and LGBT people for many decades afterwards. During the 1987 Forsyth County protests, thousands of marchers on both sides came from outside the area; officials kept peace with police officers and National Guard protecting the event.

From 2007 to 2009, the county received national attention because of a severe drought. Water supplies for the Atlanta area and downstream areas of Alabama and Florida were threatened. This followed a more severe drought in 2007 and 2008, and flooding in 2009. Flooding occurred in 2013, and severe drought again in 2016. Georgia, Alabama and Florida have been in a tri-state water dispute since 1990 over apportionment of water flow from Lake Lanier, which forms the eastern border of the county and is regulated by the Army Corps of Engineers as a federal project.

History

Before European contact
For thousands of years, varying indigenous cultures lived in this area along the Etowah River. Starting near the end of the first millennium, Mound Builders of the Mississippian culture settled in this area; they built earthwork mound structures at nearby Etowah in present-day Bartow County, and large communities along the Etowah River in neighboring Cherokee County. They disappeared about 1500 AD.

Members of the Iroquoian-speaking Cherokee Nation migrated into the area from the North, possibly from the Great Lakes area. They settled in the territory that would become Forsyth County and throughout upper Georgia and Alabama, also having settlements or towns in present-day Tennessee and western North Carolina.

19th century
After the discovery of gold by European Americans in the surrounding area in 1829, numerous settlers moved into the area. They increased the pressure on the state and federal government to have the Cherokee and other Native Americans removed to west of the Mississippi River, in order to extinguish their land claims and make land available for purchase. The Cherokee were forced to relocate during what was called the Trail of Tears.

Forsyth County was named after John Forsyth, Governor of Georgia from 1827 to 1829 and Secretary of State under Presidents Andrew Jackson and Martin Van Buren. For many years, much of this hill country was farmed by yeomen farmers, who owned few or no slaves.

20th century

The county population of about 10,000 was 90 percent "white" in the early 20th century, and residents still depended on agriculture. Its more than 1,000 blacks included 440 persons classified as mixed race on the census, indicating a continuing history of racial mixing that dated to slavery times.

Lynching and other violence driving non-white people from the county
After two different incidents in September 1912, in which black men were alleged to have assaulted white women, tensions rose in the county.

In the first case, a woman claimed she awoke to find two black men in her bedroom. A black preacher was later assaulted by whites for making disparaging comments about the victim. The sheriff gained support from the governor, who sent more than 20 National Guard troops to keep peace. The suspects were never tried, for lack of evidence. In the second case, a white woman was attacked and raped, allegedly by black men; she later died of her injuries. A lynch mob stormed the Cumming county jail and dragged out one of the suspects, Rob Edwards. They shot him and hung his body in the town square. At trial in early October, two black youths under the age of 18 were quickly convicted by an all-white jury; they were executed by hanging later that month.

Afterward, whites harassed and intimidated blacks in Forsyth and neighboring counties. Within weeks, they forced most of the blacks to leave the region in fear of their lives, losing land and personal property that was never recovered.

By 1987, the county was "all white". In 1997, African Americans numbered just 39 in a population of 75,739.

Later 20th century
During the 1950s, with the introduction of the poultry industry, the county had steady economic growth but remained largely rural and all white in population. Georgia State Route 400 opened in 1971 and was eventually extended through the county and northward; it stimulated population growth as residential housing was developed in the county and it became a bedroom community for people working in Atlanta, which had expanding work opportunities.  The opening of Georgia State Route 400 also spurred industrial growth in the South West portion of the county along the McFarland Parkway corridor starting in the early 1970s.

By 1980, the county population was 27,500, growing to 40,000 in 1987. While some blacks worked in the county in new industries, none lived there. The county gained more than 30 new industries from 1980 and unemployment was low. Such growth resulted in the median income, formerly low, "rising faster than in any other county in Georgia." A small civil rights march by African Americans in the county seat of Cumming in January 1987 was attacked by people throwing rocks, dirt and bottles. A week later another, much larger march took place, with civil rights activists going from Atlanta to Cumming protected by police and the National Guard. Thousands of protesters joined a counter-demonstration. Local people said conditions had been improving for minorities, but whites appeared to be reacting to the march out of fear.

21st century
Forsyth County continued to be developed for subdivisions, industry and related businesses. By 2008 it had been ranked for several years among the top ten fastest-growing counties of the United States. Many new subdivisions have been constructed, several around top-quality golf courses. The county's proximity to Atlanta and the Blue Ridge mountains, and bordering  Lake Sidney Lanier, has attracted many new residents. More than 60% of the current population either lived elsewhere in 1987 or had not yet been born.

The growth has put a strain on water supplies, especially during area droughts in the 21st century. Suburban growth has greatly increased water consumption in the area to maintain lawns and gardens, and supply new households. The region had severe droughts in 2007-2008 that threatened downriver water supplies in Alabama and Florida, in addition to Atlanta, in 2013 and in 2016. Bans on outdoor use of water were put in place, and the area has encouraged conversion of toilets and appliances to those that use less water. A severe drought in southern Forsyth County was declared by the end of June 2016. Several county organizations work to plan growth that can sustain the high quality of life in the area.

Racial history 

The changing dynamics between white and black citizens after the Civil War resulted in tensions across the southern United States as whites tried to maintain dominance. They used violence to intimidate black voters and regain control of state legislatures, ending Reconstruction. At the turn of the 20th century, white Democrats dominated the Georgia legislature and passed laws increasing barriers to voter registration and voting, effectively disenfranchising most blacks in the state. Unable to vote, they were also excluded from juries. The white legislators passed racial segregation and other Jim Crow laws. Racial tensions increased as rural workers started to move to industrializing cities. Whites rioted against blacks in the Atlanta in 1906, resulting in more than 20 dead.

Racial violence broke out in Forsyth County in September 1912, following allegations of sexual attacks by black men of white women.

Forsyth County had a county population with a minority of ethnic African residents. The 1910 census recorded 10,847 white, 658 black, and 440 mulatto (mixed-race) residents, making the number of black citizens slightly more than 10% (as classified under the binary system of the South that classified all people of any African descent as Negro or black). They tended to work as sharecroppers, with some women working as domestic servants, and struggled with poverty.

In early September 1912 a white woman said she was the victim of an attempted rape by two black men, but they left before she was hurt. On September 7, 1912, police arrested five black men in connection with the assault, including Tony Howell and Isaiah Pirkle. That same afternoon members of numerous area black churches gathered for a barbecue just outside the county seat of Cumming. Preacher Grant Smith was heard to question the alleged victim's account, saying that perhaps she had been caught and had lied about what was actually a consensual relationship with a black man. (The mixed-race population in the county showed that whites and blacks had relationships; most were between white men and black or mixed-race women, which the whites tried to treat as a secret.) Whites horse-whipped Smith outside the courthouse, where he was rescued by police and taken into custody for his safety.

They locked him in the courthouse for safety. Rumors spread on both sides; whites said that the blacks threatened to dynamite the town. White residents gathered a lynch mob of 500 men (when Cumming had only 300 residents in total), with men coming to join from surrounding areas. They talked of lynching the black citizens held at the jail. By 1:30 p.m., the Sheriff deputized 25 men and called the Governor for help, who ordered in 23 National Guardsmen from nearby Gainesville, Georgia.

The next day, September 8, Mae Crow, a 19-year-old white woman, was allegedly attacked in a nearby community while walking to her aunt's house. She was allegedly pulled into the woods and assaulted. According to later testimony, she was allegedly raped by Ernest Knox, a 16-year-old black who worked as a hired hand at a neighbor's farm. Knox was said to have told friends about the incident: Oscar Daniel (17), his sister Trussie (Jane) Daniel (21), and her live-in boyfriend Rob Edwards (24), who also went to the scene. They left the girl, thinking she had died and being afraid to get involved. Crow was found the next day by a search party; whites said later that she had regained consciousness briefly and named Knox as her attacker, but no newspaper reported this. A small hand mirror found at the scene was recognized as belonging to Knox; police used it to connect him to the crime and arrested him that morning. Police said he confessed fully. Because of the trouble two days before in Cumming, they took Knox to the jail in Gainesville. Hearing threats of a lynch mob there, officials moved him to a jail in Atlanta.

The following day, Knox's friends were arrested in connection with the Mae Crow assault. Oscar Daniel and Rob Edwards were suspects in rape, and Trussie Daniel was held for not reporting the crime and as an accomplice. Ed Collins, a black neighbor, was picked up and held as a witness. They were detained in the small Cumming jail. The Atlanta Journal reported that Sheriff Reid drove through a mob of 2,000 people to get the suspects to the jail.

Within a few hours on September 9, the white mob increased to 4,000 people, who stormed the jail. Sheriff Reid was not there, having strategically left deputy Mitchell Lummus alone to protect the prisoners. Deputy Lummus hid most of them, but Rob Edwards was shot and killed by the mob while still in his cell. They dragged him out, mutilated him, and dragged his body behind a wagon, before hanging him from a telephone pole at the northwest corner of the Square. The coroner's inquest, held on September 18, 1912, found the cause of death to be a gunshot by an unknown assailant.

Crow died in the hospital two weeks later on September 23, 1912. The cause of death was listed as pneumonia. Knox and Daniel were indicted for rape and murder on September 30. Trussie Daniel and Ed Collins were both charged as accomplices.

 All five trials, (including Tony Howell for the Ellen Grice case) were set for October 3 in Cumming, the county seat.  The prisoners were escorted by four companies of the state militia by train to the Buford, Georgia station, and walked the remaining .

The trial of Tony Howell was postponed due to the lack of evidence. Howell had an alibi, with Isaiah Pirkle as a witness. The case would never go to trial, and was eventually dismissed.

As part of a plea bargain, Trussie Daniel changed her story and agreed to turn state's witness. Charges against her and Collins were dropped, in exchange for her testimony against Knox, her brother Oscar, and Edwards. The all-white jury deliberated 16 minutes and returned a verdict of guilty in Knox's case. Although no confession or other evidence linked Oscar Daniel to the crime, his sister's testimony was fatal. The all-white jury pronounced him guilty that night.

On the following day, October 4, both teenagers were sentenced to death by hanging, scheduled for October 25. State law prohibited public hangings. The scheduled execution was to be viewed only by the victim's family, a minister, and law officers. Gallows were built off the square in Cumming. A fence erected around the gallows was burned down the night before the execution. A crowd estimated at between 5,000 and 8,000 gathered to watch the hanging of the two youths, at a time when the total county population was around 12,000.

In the following months, a small group of men called "Night Riders" terrorized black citizens, threatening them to leave in 24 hours or be killed. Those who resisted were subjected to further harassment, including shots fired into their homes, or livestock killed. Some white residents tried to stop the Night Riders, but were unsuccessful. An estimated 98% of black residents of Forsyth County left. Some property owners were able to sell, likely at a loss. The renters and sharecroppers left to seek safer places. Those who abandoned property, and failed to continue paying property tax, eventually lost it, and whites took it over. Many black properties ended up in white hands without a sale and without a legal transfer of title. The anti-black campaign spread across Northern Georgia, with similar results of whites expelling blacks in many surrounding counties.

In the 1910 Census, more than 1,000 black and mixed-race people were recorded in Forsyth County, with slightly more than 10,000 whites. By the 1920 Census only 30 ethnic African Americans remained in the county.

In the 2000s and 2010s, Forsyth County experienced unprecedented growth partly due to white flight from north Fulton County as a result of the rapid increase of Asians settling in that area which borders the southern part of Forsyth County.  For example, the highly rated Northview High School based in north Fulton County, went from 60% white and 30% Asian in 2007 to 50% Asian and 30% white in 2017. Many white parents claimed north Fulton County public schools with a relatively high percentage of Asian students became overwhelmingly academically competitive which negatively impacted their children's mental health and social life.

Since the 1990s, Forsyth County has become more racially and culturally diverse.  There are an increasing number of Asian, Hispanic, and African-American families relocating to Forsyth County mainly due to the abundance of resource-rich public schools in the county.

Marches and demonstrations of the 1980s

More ethnically diverse citizens had begun in recent years to migrate to the county, particularly in the affluent southern portion. However, racial tension continued to be a part of the county's image into the early 1990s. On January 17, 1987, civil rights activists marched in Cumming, and a counter-demonstration was made by a branch of the Ku Klux Klan, most of whom were not residents of the county, as well as others who objected to the march. According to a story published in The New York Times on January 18, four marchers were slightly injured by stones and bottles thrown at them. Eight people from the counter-demonstration, all white, were arrested. The charges included trespassing and carrying concealed weapons.

White Forsyth resident Charles A. Blackburn wanted to have a brotherhood march to celebrate the first annual celebration of national holiday Martin Luther King Jr. Day. He wanted to dispel the racist image of Forsyth County, where he owned and operated a private school, the Blackburn Learning Center. Blackburn cancelled his plans after he received threatening phone calls. Other whites in nearby counties, as well as State Representative Billy McKinney of Atlanta and Hosea Williams, who was on the Atlanta City Council, took up the march plans instead.

The following week, January 24, approximately 20,000 participants marched in Cumming. This occurrence produced no violence, despite the presence of more than 5,000 counter-demonstrators, summoned by the Forsyth County Defense League. The county and state had mustered about 2,000 peace officers and national guardsmen. Forsyth County paid $670,000 for police overtime during the political demonstration. Many residents were outraged to have to pay for the march, as most participants were from outside the county. (V. S. Naipaul's interview with Forsyth County Sheriff Wesley Walraven, before the second march, is referred to in his book A Turn in the South.)

The demonstration is thought to have been the largest civil rights demonstration in the U.S. since about 1970. The unexpected turnout of some 5,000 counter-demonstrators, 66 of whom were arrested for "parading without a permit," turned out to be the largest resistance opposed to civil rights since the 1960s. The counter-demonstration was called by the Forsyth County Defense League and the Nationalist Movement, newly organized in Cumming by local plumber Mark Watts.

Marchers came for the second march from all over the country, forming a caravan from Atlanta; National Guard troops were assigned for protection on freeway overpasses along the route. When marchers, including John Lewis, Andrew Young, Julian Bond, Coretta Scott King, Joseph Lowery, Sam Nunn, Benjamin Hooks, Gary Hart and Wyche Fowler arrived, they discovered that most of the Cumming residents had left town for the day. Some had boarded up their windows because they feared violence.  Marchers wound slowly through streets lined by hundreds of armed National Guardsmen, many of them black. Forsyth County subsequently charged large fees for parade permits until the practice was overturned in Forsyth County, Georgia v. The Nationalist Movement (505 U.S. 123) in the Supreme Court of the United States on June 19, 1992.

Geography

The eastern two-thirds of Forsyth County are located in the Upper Chattahoochee River sub-basin of the ACF River Basin (Apalachicola-Chattahoochee-Flint River Basin), while the northwestern third of the county is located in the Etowah River sub-basin of the ACT River Basin (Coosa-Tallapoosa River Basin).

Adjacent counties
 Dawson County - north
 Hall County - east
 Gwinnett County - southeast
 Fulton County - southwest
 Cherokee County - northwest

National protected areas
 Chattahoochee River National Recreation Area (part)

Transportation

Major highways

  U.S. Route 19 (Lee Highway)
  State Route 9
  State Route 20
  State Route 53
  State Route 141
  State Route 306
  State Route 369
  State Route 371
  State Route 400

Pedestrians and cycling
 Big Creek Greenway

Demographics

2010 Census
As of the 2010 United States Census, there were 175,511 people, 59,433 households, and 47,623 families residing in the county. The racial makeup of the county was 85.4% white, 6.2% Asian, 2.6% black or African American, 0.3% American Indian, 3.8% from other races, and 1.6% from two or more races. Those of Hispanic or Latino origin made up 9.4% of the population. In terms of ancestry, 15.7% were German, 14.4% were American, 14.2% were Irish, 12.9% were English, and 5.8% were Italian.

Of the 59,433 households, 46.9% had children under the age of 18 living with them, 68.5% were married couples living together, 8.0% had a female householder with no husband present, 19.9% were non-families, and 15.9% of all households were made up of individuals. The average household size was 2.94 and the average family size was 3.29. The median age was 36.9 years.

The median income for a household in the county was $87,605 and the median income for a family was $96,501. Males had a median income of $72,030 versus $46,310 for females. The per capita income for the county was $35,385. About 4.5% of families and 6.0% of the population were below the poverty line, including 7.0% of those under age 18 and 4.9% of those age 65 or over.

2020 census

The 2020 United States Census indicated that the county gained 43% in its population in the preceding decade. This was the largest percentage increase of any county in the state.

As of the 2020 United States census, there were 251,283 people, 81,765 households, and 66,802 families residing in the county.

Life expectancy 
The life expectancy in Forsyth County in 2014 was 81.28 years, up 10.98 percent from 73.24 years in 1980. By comparison, the U.S. national average in 2014 was 78.91 years.

Education

Higher education
In 2012, the University of North Georgia established its Cumming campus.

Private K-12 education
Cornerstone Schools
Covenant Christian Academy
Fideles Christian School
Friendship Christian School
Horizon Christian Academy
Ivy League Montessori School
Lakeview Academy
McGinnis Woods Country Day School
Montessori Academy at Sharon Springs
Pinecrest Academy

Public K-12 education

Forsyth County is served by Forsyth County Schools.  FCS serves over 51,000 students and is the largest employer in the county with over 8000 full-time employees and substitutes. Out of 180 school districts, FCS is the seventh largest school system in Georgia. FCS is home to 41 schools – twenty-two elementary, eleven middle, seven high schools, and one college and career high school, as well as the Academies for Creative Education (A.C.E) that houses one school, iAchieve Virtual Academy, FCS' 6–12 online school, and two programs, Gateway Academy (the alternative program for middle and high school students) and Forsyth Academy.

Elementary schools: 
 Big Creek Elementary School
 Brandywine Elementary School
 Brookwood Elementary School
 Chattahoochee Elementary School
 Chestatee Elementary School
 Coal Mountain Elementary School
 Cumming Elementary School
 Daves Creek Elementary School
 Haw Creek Elementary School
 Johns Creek Elementary School
 Kelly Mill Elementary School
 Mashburn Elementary School
 Matt Elementary School
 Midway Elementary School
 Poole's Mill Elementary School
 Sawnee Elementary School
 Settles Bridge Elementary School
 Sharon Elementary School
 Shiloh Point Elementary School
 Silver City Elementary School
 Vickery Creek Elementary School
 Whitlow Elementary School.
Middle schools:
 DeSana Middle School
 Hendricks Middle School
 Lakeside Middle School
 Liberty Middle School
 Little Mill Middle School
 North Forsyth Middle School
 Otwell Middle School
 Piney Grove Middle School
 Riverwatch Middle School
 South Forsyth Middle School
 Vickery Creek Middle School.
High schools:
 Alliance Academy for Innovation
 Denmark High School
 East Forsyth High School
 Forsyth Central High School
 Lambert High School
 North Forsyth High School
 South Forsyth High School
 West Forsyth High School.

Economy

Among the largest employers in the county are Northside Hospital, Koch Foods, Tyson Foods, Siemens, Scientific Games Corporation, Arris International, Baran Telecom, America BOA, Automation Direct, and L-3 Communications Display Systems.

An indicator that part of the county had reached the status of a mainstream suburban/exurban area and was starting to create new, positive history beyond its racist past, a mixed-use development Halcyon with residential, office, dining and entertainment facilities, opened in the southern part of the county near Alpharetta in summer 2019.

Recreation 

Lake Lanier, a  lake created and maintained by the United States Army Corps of Engineers in association with Buford Dam, is enjoyed by many residents and non-residents alike. Fishing, boating, tubing, wake boarding, and water skiing are common activities on the lake.

Forsyth County Parks and Recreation Department maintains 25 parks and facilities in the county. Most notable are Sawnee Mountain Preserve, Central Park, Fowler Park, Poole's Mill Covered Bridge and the Big Creek Greenway. The Cumming Fairgrounds host many events throughout the year including a rodeo, The Cumming Country Fair, and a farmers' market. There is also the annual 4 July Steam Engine Parade.

Government and politics
Forsyth County is governed by a five-member board of commissioners, whose members are elected from single-member districts to concurrent four-year terms, and a county manager.

Kevin Tanner has been named the county manager on Jan. 11, 2021.  Commissioner Cooper served as the secretary in 2020, and as vice chairman in 2021.

The city of Cumming is located in district 1, which also extends to the west. District 2 is located in the southern tip of Forsyth County. District 3 is to the southwest of Cumming, between districts 1 and 2. District 4 comprises most of the north of the county and district 5 comprises the east and southeast of the county, including most of the county's shoreline.

The board of commissioners has also established and is assisted by a number of governmental bodies.

The county is also a member of the Association County Commissioners of Georgia and the National Association of Counties.

Previous local officials

County managers
 Rhonda Poston-O'Connor, 2007–2008
 Doug Derrer, 2008–2017
Eric Johnson (2017-2020)

County commissioners
 Jack Conway, 2005–2006 (District 3)
 David Richard, –2008 (District 4)
 Linda K. Ledbetter, –2008 (District 5)
 Charles Laughinghouse, 2003–2010 (District 1)
 Jim Harrell, 2007–2010 (District 3)
 Patrick B. Bell, 2009–2012 (District 4)
 Jim Boff, 2009–2016 (District 5)
 Brian R. Tam, 2005–2016 (District 2)
 Rick Swope, 2017 (District 2)
 R.J. "Pete" Amos, 2011–2018 (District 1) 
Dennis T Brown 2018 - 2020 (District 2)

Other elected officials
Forsyth County had voting patterns similar to most Solid South and Georgia counties prior to 1968 in presidential elections. It only backed Republican Herbert Hoover before then once in 1928 amidst anti-Catholic sentiment towards Al Smith. From 1968 on, the county has swung strongly away from the Democratic Party at the presidential level, only failing to vote Republican in presidential elections in 1968, when segregationist George Wallace appealed to anti-Civil Rights Act sentiment, and in the two elections Georgian Jimmy Carter was on the ballot. In addition, unlike the inner suburban counties of the Atlanta metropolitan area, Forsyth County has continued to vote for Republicans by landslide margins. However, the county's heavy Republican leanings have recently weakened; in 2020, Joe Biden was the first Democratic presidential nominee to win over 30% of the county's vote since Carter, with the margin being reduced by nearly half since 2012.

United States Congress

Georgia State Senate

Georgia House of Representatives

Communities

City
 Cumming (County Seat)

Unincorporated communities
With only one officially incorporated city, the majority of Forsyth County citizens live in areas with zip codes assigned to cities in surrounding counties.
In addition, there are several unincorporated communities throughout the county.

 Big Creek
 Coal Mountain
 Chestatee
 Daves Creek
 Drew
 Ducktown
 Heardville
 Hightower
 Matt
 Oscarville
 Pirkle Woods
 Silver City

See also

 National Register of Historic Places listings in Forsyth County, Georgia
List of counties in Georgia

References

Further reading

External links
 Forsyth County Georgia, Business and Government Directory
 Forsyth County Government, County Government Portal
 Forsyth County News, Your "Hometown Paper" Since 1908
 Forsyth Herald

 
1831 establishments in Georgia (U.S. state)
Populated places established in 1831
Georgia (U.S. state) counties
Forsyth
Northeast Georgia
Counties of Appalachia
History of African-American civil rights
Sundown towns in Georgia (U.S. state)